James J. Pleasants served as the third Secretary of State of Alabama from 1821 to 1824.

He was married and had eight children, including the author, Julia Pleasants Creswell.

References

Secretaries of State of Alabama
1797 births
Year of death missing
James